Kate Williams is a British jazz pianist and composer who formed the jazz ensemble Kate Williams Quartet with saxophonist Steve Kaldestad, flautist Gareth Lockrane, bassist Oli Hayhurst and drummer David Ingamells, among others.

Early life and education
Williams was born in London into a musical family. Her mother is a classical pianist and her father is the guitarist John Williams.

Discography 
 2011: Made Up
 2012: Smoke And Mirrors
 2014: Atlas and Vulcana
 2016: Four Plus Three

References

External links

British jazz pianists
Living people
Musicians from London
21st-century British pianists
Year of birth missing (living people)